I Bificus is the third album by singer-songwriter Bif Naked, released in 1998. It features her best known songs "Moment of Weakness," "Spaceman," "Lucky," and "Chotee."

Track listing

Canadian Release – March 1998 (Her Royal Majesty's/Aquarius/EMI)
"Any Day Now" – 4:17
"Spaceman" – 4:21
"Moment of Weakness" – 2:28
"Lucky" – 4:25
"Sophia" – 4:28
"Chotee" – 3:51
"Violence" – 4:15
"The Peacock Song" – 3:02
"If I" – 4:10
"Anything" – 4:43
"Only the Girl" – 3:34
"Spaceman (Boomtang Boys Mix)" – 4:18*
"Lucky (Boomtang Boys Mix)" – 4:05*

*bonus tracks included on some editions

US/UK Release – August 1999 (Lava/Atlantic)
1. "I Died" (Bif Naked/Peter Karroll/Doug McCarvell) – 4:08
Also included on Another 5 Songs and a Poem.
2. "Any Day Now" (Bif Naked/Peter Karroll) – 4:16
3. "Spaceman [Edit]" (Bif Naked/Peter Karroll) – 3:42
The original ending of the song has been replaced by a fade-out.
4. "Moment of Weakness" (Bif Naked/Peter Karroll) – 2:30
5. "Lucky [Video Edit]" (Bif Naked/Brad McGiveron) – 3:58
There is an additional portion of the second verse and the instrumentation features more strings and less guitar.
6. "Sophia" (Bif Naked/Peter Karroll/Russ Klyne) – 4:27
7. "Chotee" (Bif Naked/Gene Poole [aka X Factor]) – 3:49
8. "Violence" (Bif Naked/Peter Karroll/Brittin Karroll) – 4:12
9. "The Peacock Song" (Bif Naked/Peter Karroll) – 3:03
10. "Anything [Edit]" (Bif Naked/Peter Karroll/Rich Priske) – 4:04
The final verse has been edited out.
11. "Only the Girl" (Bif Naked/Brad McGiveron) – 3:28
12. "Twitch" (Bif Naked/Peter Karroll) – 4:21
Also included on Another 5 Songs and a Poem.

Enhanced CD content: a link to a website featuring a music video for "Chotee."

Personnel
Bif Naked – acoustic guitar, guitar, vocals
Randy Black – drums
Coco Culbertson – drums, bass guitar, background vocals
Peter Karroll – acoustic guitar, guitar, drums, bass, background vocals
Russ Klyne – acoustic guitar
Matt Laug – drums
Oliver Leiber – acoustic guitar, electric guitar
Doug McCarvell – guitar
Lance Morrison – bass
Adam Percy – keyboards, Programming
Rich "Rock" Priske – bass
Peter Rafelson – keyboards
Mike Sage – drums, keyboards, Programming
John Webster – percussion, keyboards
Jerry Wong – guitar
Daniel Yaremko – bass

Production
Producers: Peter Karroll, Oliver Leiber, Glenn Rosenstein, John Webster
Engineers: Delwyn Brooks, Johnny Potoker, Barry Rudolph, David Swope
Assistant engineers: Delwyn Brooks, Tara Nelson, Shaun Thingvold
Mixing: Delwyn Brooks, Brian Malouf, Tara Nelson, Johnny Potoker
Mixing assistant: Delwyn Brooks, Tara Nelson
Mastering: Andy VanDette
Digital Editing: Tal Herzberg
Programming: Adam Percy, Mike Sage, John Webster
Drum Programming: Oliver Leiber
Keyboard Programming: Oliver Leiber
Arranger: Peter Karroll
String Coordinator: Glenn Rosenstein
Layout Design: Ralph Alfonso
Artwork: Ralph Alfonso
Photo Concept: Karen Moskowitz
Photography: David Leyes, Karen Moskowitz
Liner Notes: Bif Naked
Illustrations: Bif Naked
Hand Lettering: Bif Naked
Drawing: Bif Naked

Charts

Year-end charts

Certifications

References

Bif Naked albums
1998 albums